Saalkreis was a district (Kreis) in the south of Saxony-Anhalt, Germany. Neighboring districts were (from west clockwise) Mansfelder Land, Bernburg, Köthen, Bitterfeld, the district Delitzsch in Saxony, and the district Merseburg-Querfurt. The district-free city Halle is nearly surrounded by the district.

Geography 
The main river of the district is the Saale, which also gave it its name. Other rivers and streams flowing through the former district are the Laweke, Würde, Kabelske, Strengbach and Götsche. Whilst the western part of the region is dominated by hillocks and dissecting valleys, the north and east are characterized by flat plains.

Coat of arms

Towns and municipalities

External links 
  (German)

Districts of Prussia

pl:Powiat Saale